Jeffrey Timberlake is an American businessperson, farmer, and politician from Maine. A Republican, Timberlake represents District 22 in the Maine Senate. Previously, he served in the Maine House of Representatives from 2010 to 2018. In House, Timberlake represented District 96, which Hebron, Minot and his residence in Turner. He earned an associate degree in business management from Central Maine Community College. He is also a former member of the Turner Planning Board.

During his first term in the Senate, Timberlake served as Assistant Minority Leader. After Sen. Dana Dow lost re-election in November 2020, Timberlake was elected Minority Leader of the Republican caucus.

References

21st-century American politicians
Central Maine Community College alumni
Living people
Republican Party members of the Maine House of Representatives
Minority leaders of the Maine Senate
People from Turner, Maine
Year of birth missing (living people)